Jessica Walter (January 31, 1941 – March 24, 2021) was an American actress who appeared in over 170 film, stage and television productions. In film, she was best known for her role as a psychotic and obsessed fan of a local disc jockey in  the 1971 Clint Eastwood film, Play Misty for Me.  On television, she was most recently known for her role of Lucille Bluth on the sitcom Arrested Development (2003–06, 2013–19), and providing the voice of Malory Archer on the FX animated series Archer (2009–21). Walter received various awards over the course of her television career including a Primetime Emmy Award for Amy Prentiss (1975). She also received two Golden Globe Award nominations and three Screen Actors Guild Award nominations.  For her starring role opposite Eastwood in Play Misty for Me, Walter received a Golden Globe nomination for Best Actress in a Motion Picture – Drama.

After studying acting at the Neighborhood Playhouse School of the Theatre in New York City, Walter began her career on the Broadway stage, winning a 1963 Clarence Derwent Award for Outstanding Debut Performance. She made her film debut in the 1964 neo-noir drama Lilith then subsequently starred in the 1966 films Grand Prix and The Group.  Both performances earned her critical acclaim.

Throughout her career, Walter was a regular presence on American television, playing the titular role in the short-lived police procedural Amy Prentiss, appearing in a recurring role on Trapper John, M.D., working as a series regular for the first half of season one of 90210, and providing the voice of Fran Sinclair on the series Dinosaurs. Her role as scheming socialite Lucille Bluth in Arrested Development brought her renewed attention, and she contributed voiceover work to animated shows like Archer and Star vs. the Forces of Evil (2015–18).

Early life
Walter was born on January 31, 1941, in Brooklyn, New York City, to parents Esther (née Groisser), a teacher, and David Walter. Walter's father was from a Polish-Jewish family. He was a musician and member of the NBC Symphony Orchestra who had attended New York City's High School of Performing Arts. Walter's mother was from a Jewish family who migrated to the US from Russia in 1923. Her brother, Richard Walter, is a screenwriter.

Career
Walter began her acting career on stage, winning a Clarence Derwent Award in 1963 for Outstanding Debut Broadway Performance in Photo Finish by Peter Ustinov. She soon moved to television, and played Julie Muranoon on the television series, Love of Life. While appearing on Love of Life from 1962 to 1965, she also acted on many other popular television series, including Naked City, East Side/West Side, Ben Casey, Route 66, The Doctors and the Nurses, The Rogues, and The Defenders. Among those series is Walter's role as Lorna Richmond on "The Ordeal of Mrs. Snow" episode of The Alfred Hitchcock Hour (April 14, 1964), and a supporting role as William Shatner's wife on the drama For the People (1965).

In 1964, Walter appeared in the first episode of the television series, Flipper as well as the episode "How Much for a Prince?" in CBS's drama The Reporter. In 1966, she appeared in "The White Knight" episode of The Fugitive.

Her earliest notable and acclaimed screen role was in the Clint Eastwood-directed film, Play Misty for Me (1971).  Walter played Evelyn, a young woman who became violently obsessed with a disc jockey.  Evelyn is known to repeatedly call a California radio station during a jazz music program hosted by Eastwood's character, Dave Garver, always requesting he play the Erroll Garner standard, "Misty".  In the course of becoming infatuated with Garver, Evelyn seduces him and then attempts suicide in his home.  Her obsessive behavior intensifies and she begins stalking him relentlessly and eventually breaks into his house.  In a frenzy, Evelyn destroys the interior of the home and stabs his housekeeper Birdie (played by Clarice Taylor), who is hospitalized but survives.  For her performance in the film, Walter received a Golden Globe Award nomination in the Best Motion Picture Actress – Drama category as well as critical praise.  Film critic Roger Ebert described Walter as demonstrating "unnerving effectiveness" in the role. 

Walter's other film credits from that era include Lilith (1964), Grand Prix (1966), The Group (1966), Bye Bye Braverman (1968), and Number One (1969). She was also in an episode of Mannix (starring Mike Connors), "Moving Target" in season 5.

During the 1970s, Walter co-starred in an episode of Columbo, "Mind Over Mayhem", had a recurring role on Trapper John, M.D. as Melanie McIntyre, Trapper John's former wife, and starred on the series Amy Prentiss, a spinoff of Ironside, for which she won a Primetime Emmy Award. 

In 1980s, she had a role on the NBC primetime soap opera Bare Essence as Ava Marshall. Following Bare Essence, Walter worked most frequently in television and theater, though she did appear in some films including The Flamingo Kid (1984) and the film PCU (1994). She recorded a performance as the doll form of Chucky for the 1988 horror film Child's Play, but her lines were redubbed by Brad Dourif after negative test screenings which Tom Holland and Don Mancini attributed partially to Walter's performance; they claimed Walter was effectively frightening in the role but failed to convey the sense of black humor they envisioned the character to have and that her voice seemed out of place because the character was male. 

In the 1990s, Walter voiced Fran Sinclair on the ABC comedy Dinosaurs, and appeared on Just Shoot Me! as Eve Gallo, the mother of Maya and the ex-wife of magazine publisher Jack Gallo.

From 2003 to 2006, she appeared in a regular role as the scheming alcoholic socialite matriarch Lucille Bluth on Fox's comedy series Arrested Development. In 2005, she received a nomination for the Primetime Emmy Award for Outstanding Supporting Actress - Comedy Series for the role. Despite her convincing portrayal of Lucille, she states: "I'm nothing like Lucille. Nothing. My daughter will tell you. I'm really a very nice, boring person." Despite acclaim from critics, Arrested Development received low ratings and viewership on Fox, which cancelled the series in 2006. It was revived by Netflix for season four in 2013, where it gained huge popularity. Walter reprised her role for season five, premiering in 2018.

Walter played Tabitha Wilson on the first season of 90210 (2008-2009), until the character was written off halfway through the season. In 2007, she guest-starred on the sitcom Rules of Engagement in the episode titled "Kids" and in 2009 guest-starred in an episode of Law & Order: SVU as legal-aid lawyer Petra Gilmartin.  Previously in 2008, she had appeared in Law & Order: Criminal Intent as Eleanor Reynolds in the episode "Please Note We Are No Longer Accepting Letters of Recommendation from Henry Kissinger". From 2011 to 2012, she starred in the TV Land sitcom Retired at 35 alongside her Bye Bye Braverman co-star George Segal.

Walter starred as Evangeline Harcourt in the Broadway revival of Anything Goes, which began previews in March 2011 and officially opened on April 7, 2011.

Walter voiced spymaster Malory Archer on the FX animated series Archer. Walter mentioned that her performance in Arrested Development was explicitly referenced when auditions for the part of Malory were sought.

In May 2018, Walter became part of an on-set controversy regarding harassment she said she had received from Arrested Development co-star Jeffrey Tambor. During a cast interview with the New York Times, Walter was asked about an incident which Tambor had alluded to several months before. Walter teared up and stated that "[i]n like almost 60 years of working, I've never had anybody yell at me like that on a set. And it's hard to deal with, but I'm over it now", while also noting that Tambor had apologized and had not done anything sexually inappropriate, and that she would work with him again. During the same interview, co-stars Jason Bateman, Tony Hale, and David Cross were criticized in multiple media outlets for appearing to excuse Tambor's behavior without acknowledging Walter's experience. Within days, all three men had issued apologies to Walter.

Personal life
Walter was married to Ross Bowman, a former Broadway stage manager and television director, from 1966 to 1978. The marriage produced a daughter, Brooke Bowman, formerly an executive for 21st Century Fox and currently a Senior Vice President of development at ABC Family.  Walter had one grandson. During her first marriage, a fire broke out in the couple's tenth-floor apartment in September 1966 while Bowman was out of town. Walter was rescued by a firefighter. 

In 1983, Walter married actor Ron Leibman. They remained married until his death in 2019. Walter and Leibman appeared together in Neil Simon's play Rumors, portrayed a husband and wife in the film Dummy (2003), and on Law & Order (in the episode "House Counsel"). Leibman joined the cast of Archer, voicing her character's new husband. 

While Walter's mother raised her daughter in the Jewish tradition, Walter later described herself as not religious but "very Jewish in my heart".

On March 24, 2021, Walter died in her sleep at her Manhattan home. She was 80 years old.

Filmography

Awards and nominations

Notes

References

External links

 

 
 
 
 
 Jessica Walter on tvland.com

1941 births
2021 deaths
20th-century American actresses
21st-century American actresses
Actresses from New York City
American film actresses
American people of Polish-Jewish descent
American stage actresses
American television actresses
American voice actresses
Jewish American actresses
Neighborhood Playhouse School of the Theatre alumni
Outstanding Performance by a Lead Actress in a Miniseries or Movie Primetime Emmy Award winners
People from Brooklyn
People from Queens, New York
American people of Russian-Jewish descent
21st-century American Jews